Joshua Hassall (November 1871 – 1895) was an English footballer who played in the Football League for Wolverhampton Wanderers.

References

1871 births
1895 deaths
English footballers
Association football goalkeepers
English Football League players
Birmingham St George's F.C. players
Stafford Rangers F.C. players
Wolverhampton Wanderers F.C. players